The 2019 Nicholls Colonels baseball team represented Nicholls State University in the 2019 NCAA Division I baseball season. The Colonels played their home games at Ben Meyer Diamond at Ray E. Didier Field.

Roster

Coaching staff

Schedule

! style="" | Regular Season
|- valign="top" 

|- bgcolor="#ffcccc"
| 1 || February 15 || Southern Illinois || Ben Meyer Diamond at Ray E. Didier Field • Thibodaux, LA || L 5–6 || 0–1 ||
|- bgcolor="#ccffcc"
| 2 || February 16 || Southern Illinois || Ben Meyer Diamond at Ray E. Didier Field • Thibodaux, LA || W 3–2 || 1–1 ||
|- bgcolor="#ccffcc"
| 3 || February 17 || Southern Illinois || Ben Meyer Diamond at Ray E. Didier Field • Thibodaux, LA || W 7-3 || 2–1 || 
|- bgcolor="#ccffcc"
| 4 || February 19 || Alcorn State || Ben Meyer Diamond at Ray E. Didier Field • Thibodaux, LA || W 25–5 || 3–1 ||
|- bgcolor="#ccffcc"
| 5 || February 22 || Grambling State || Ben Meyer Diamond at Ray E. Didier Field • Thibodaux, LA || W 6–1 || 4–1 ||
|- bgcolor="#ccffcc"
| 6 || February 24 || Grambling State || Ben Meyer Diamond at Ray E. Didier Field • Thibodaux, LA || W 16–5 || 5–1 ||
|- bgcolor="#ccffcc"
| 7 || February 24 || Grambling State || Ben Meyer Diamond at Ray E. Didier Field • Thibodaux, LA || W 7-2 || 6-1 ||
|- bgcolor="#ffcccc"
| 8 || February 26 || Tulane || Ben Meyer Diamond at Ray E. Didier Field • Thibodaux, LA || L 4–7 || 6–2 ||
|-

|- bgcolor="#ffcccc"
| 9 || March 1 || vs. McNeese State (Mardi Gras Classic) || Joe Miller Ballpark • Lake Charles, LA || L 6–7 || 6–3 ||
|- bgcolor="#ccffcc"
| 10 || March 2 || vs. Holy Cross (Mardi Gras Classic) || Joe Miller Ballpark • Lake Charles, LA || W 11–2 || 7–3 ||
|- bgcolor="#ffcccc"
| 11 || March 3 || vs. Holy Cross (Mardi Gras Classic) || Joe Miller Ballpark • Lake Charles, LA || L 6–8 || 7–4 ||
|- bgcolor="#ffcccc"
| 12 || March 3 || vs. McNeese State (Mardi Gras Classic) || Joe Miller Ballpark • Lake Charles, LA || L 4–5 (10 inn) || 7–5 ||
|- bgcolor="#ffcccc"
| 13 || March 5 || Louisiana || Ben Meyer Diamond at Ray E. Didier Field • Thibodaux, LA || L 1–3 || 7–6 ||
|- bgcolor="#ffcccc"
| 14 || March 6 || at South Alabama || Eddie Stanky Field • Mobile, AL || L 3–6 || 7–7 ||
|- bgcolor="#ffcccc"
| 15 || March 8 || New Orleans || Ben Meyer Diamond at Ray E. Didier Field • Thibodaux, LA || L 2–3 || 7–8 || 0-1
|- bgcolor="#ccffcc"
| 16 || March 9 || New Orleans || Ben Meyer Diamond at Ray E. Didier Field • Thibodaux, LA || W 3-2 || 8–8 || 1-1
|- bgcolor="#ccffcc"
| 17 || March 10 || New Orleans || Ben Meyer Diamond at Ray E. Didier Field • Thibodaux, LA || W 9–1 || 9–8 || 2-1
|- bgcolor="#ccffcc"
| 18 || March 12 || Alcorn State || Ben Meyer Diamond at Ray E. Didier Field • Thibodaux, LA || W 10–1 || 10–8 ||
|- bgcolor="#ffffff"
| 19 || March 13 || at Alcorn State || Foster Baseball Field at McGowan Stadium • Lorman, MS || colspan=4 |Game postponed
|- bgcolor="#ffcccc"
| 20 || March 15 || at Central Arkansas || Bear Stadium • Conway, AR || L 3-4 || 10–9 || 2-2
|- bgcolor="#ffcccc"
| 21 || March 16 || at Central Arkansas || Bear Stadium • Conway, AR || L 0-5 || 10–10 || 2-3
|- bgcolor="#ccffcc"
| 22 || March 17 || at Central Arkansas || Bear Stadium • Conway, AR || W 2-1 || 11–10 || 3-3
|- bgcolor="#ffcccc"
| 23 || March 20 || at LSU || Alex Box Stadium, Skip Bertman Field • Baton Rouge, LA || L 4-5 (10 inn) || 11–11 ||
|- bgcolor="#ccffcc"
| 24 || March 22 || Texas A&M-Corpus Christi || Ben Meyer Diamond at Ray E. Didier Field • Thibodaux, LA || W 5-3 || 12–11 || 4-3
|- bgcolor="#ffcccc"
| 25 || March 23 || Texas A&M-Corpus Christi || Ben Meyer Diamond at Ray E. Didier Field • Thibodaux, LA || L 3–4 (10 inn) || 12–12 || 4-4
|- align="center" bgcolor="#ccffcc
| 26 || March 24 || Texas A&M-Corpus Christi || Ben Meyer Diamond at Ray E. Didier Field • Thibodaux, LA || W 6–3 || 13–12 || 5–4
|- align="center" bgcolor="#ffcccc
| 26 || March 26 || vs. Southern Miss || Shrine on Airline • Metairie, LA || L 0–5 || 13–13 || 
|- align="center" bgcolor="#ccffcc
| 26 || March 29 || at Lamar || Vincent–Beck Stadium • Beaumont, TX || W 4–2 || 14–13 || 6-4 
|- align="center" bgcolor="#ccffcc
| 26 || March 30 || at Lamar || Vincent–Beck Stadium • Beaumont, TX || W 5–4 (13 inn) || 15–13 || 7-4 
|- align="center" bgcolor="#ccffcc
| 26 || March 31 || at Lamar || Vincent–Beck Stadium • Beaumont, TX || W 6–5 || 16–13 || 8-4 
|-

|- bgcolor="#ccffcc"
| 27 || April 2 || Southern || Ben Meyer Diamond at Ray E. Didier Field • Thibodaux, LA || W 4-2 || 17–13 ||
|- bgcolor="#ffcccc"
| 28 || April 5 || at Northwestern State || H. Alvin Brown–C. C. Stroud Field • Natchitoches, LA || L 1–7 || 17–14 || 8–5
|- bgcolor="#ffcccc"
| 29 || April 5 || at Northwestern State || H. Alvin Brown–C. C. Stroud Field • Natchitoches, LA || L 7–9 || 17–15 || 8–6
|- bgcolor="#ffcccc"
| 30 || April 7 || at Northwestern State || H. Alvin Brown–C. C. Stroud Field • Natchitoches, LA || L 2–3 (7 inn) || 17–16 || 8–7
|- bgcolor="#ffffff"
| 31 || April 10 || at Alcorn State || Foster Baseball Field at McGowan Stadium • Lorman, MS || colspan=4 |Game canceled
|- bgcolor="#ffcccc"
| 32 || April 12 || Incarnate Word || Ben Meyer Diamond at Ray E. Didier Field • Thibodaux, LA || L 4–6 || 17–17 || 8–8
|- bgcolor="#ccffcc"
| 33 || April 13 || Incarnate Word || Ben Meyer Diamond at Ray E. Didier Field • Thibodaux, LA || W 7–3 || 18–17 || 9–8
|- bgcolor="#ffcccc"
| 34 || April 14 || Incarnate Word || Ben Meyer Diamond at Ray E. Didier Field • Thibodaux, LA || L 4–7 || 18–18 || 9–9
|- bgcolor="#ffcccc"
| 35 || April 19 || at Southeastern Louisiana || Pat Kenelly Diamond at Alumni Field • Hammond, LA || L 1–3 || 18–19 || 9-10
|- bgcolor="#ccffcc"
| 36 || April 19 || at Southeastern Louisiana || Pat Kenelly Diamond at Alumni Field • Hammond, LA || W 4-1 || 19–19 || 10–10
|- bgcolor="#ffcccc"
| 37 || April 20 || Southeastern Louisiana || Ben Meyer Diamond at Ray E. Didier Field • Thibodaux, LA || L 1–11 || 19–20 || 10–11
|- bgcolor="#ffcccc"
| 38 || April 23 || at Jackson State || Braddy Field • Jackson, MS || L 0–6 || 19–21 ||
|- bgcolor="#ccffcc"
| 39 || April 24 || LSU-Alexandria || Ben Meyer Diamond at Ray E. Didier Field • Thibodaux, LA || W 3–0 || 20–21 || 
|- bgcolor="#ccffcc"
| 40 || April 26 || San Jose State || Ben Meyer Diamond at Ray E. Didier Field • Thibodaux, LA || W 3–2 || 21–21 ||
|- bgcolor="#ccffcc"
| 41 || April 27 || San Jose State || Ben Meyer Diamond at Ray E. Didier Field • Thibodaux, LA || W 6–5 (16 inn) || 22–21 ||
|- bgcolor="#ccffcc"
| 42 || April 28 || San Jose State || Ben Meyer Diamond at Ray E. Didier Field • Thibodaux, LA || W 10–7 || 23–21 ||
|-

|- bgcolor="#ffcccc"
| 43 || May 1 || at Southern || Lee-Hines Field • Baton Rouge, LA || L 5–6 || 23–22 ||
|- bgcolor="#ffcccc"
| 44 || May 3 || Houston Baptist || Ben Meyer Diamond at Ray E. Didier Field • Thibodaux, LA || L 7-11 (12 inn) || 23–23 || 10–12
|- bgcolor="#ccffcc"
| 45 || May 4 || Houston Baptist || Ben Meyer Diamond at Ray E. Didier Field • Thibodaux, LA || W 4–3 (15 inn) || 24–23 || 11–12
|- bgcolor="#ffcccc"
| 46 || May 5 || Houston Baptist || Ben Meyer Diamond at Ray E. Didier Field • Thibodaux, LA || L 3–6 || 24–24 || 11–13
|- bgcolor="#ccffcc"
| 47 || May 7 || at Tulane || Greer Field at Turchin Stadium • New Orleans, LA || W 5–3 || 25–24 || 
|- bgcolor="#ffcccc"
| 48 || May 10 || Stephen F. Austin || Ben Meyer Diamond at Ray E. Didier Field • Thibodaux, LA || L 1–5 || 25–25 || 11–14
|- bgcolor="#ccffcc"
| 49 || May 11 || Stephen F. Austin || Ben Meyer Diamond at Ray E. Didier Field • Thibodaux, LA || W 6-3 || 26-25 || 12-14
|- bgcolor="#ccffcc"
| 50 || May 12 || Stephen F. Austin || Ben Meyer Diamond at Ray E. Didier Field • Thibodaux, LA || W 13–7 || 27–25 || 13–14
|- bgcolor="#ffcccc"
| 51 || May 16 || at Abilene Christian || Crutcher Scott Field • Abilene, TX || L 8–10 || 27–26 || 13–15
|- bgcolor="#ffcccc"
| 52 || May 17 || at Abilene Christian || Crutcher Scott Field • Abilene, TX || L 4–5 (13 inn) || 27–27 || 13–16
|- bgcolor="#ffcccc"
| 53 || May 17 || at Abilene Christian || Crutcher Scott Field • Abilene, TX || L 2–6 || 27–28 || 13–17
|-

|

References

Nicholls Colonels
Nicholls Colonels baseball seasons
Nicholls Colonels baseball